The British Army Jungle Warfare Training School (Jungle Warfare Division - JWD) is the British Army's training establishment located at Medicina Lines, Seria, in the sultanate of Brunei Darussalam.

The courses run by JWD which train soldiers and Royal Marines are:
Operational Tracking Instructors Course (OTIC)
Jungle Warfare Instructors Course (JWIC)

The original Jungle Warfare School was at Kota Tinggi, Johor, in Malaya.  This operated from 1948 to 1971, training Commonwealth troops and later Asian forces.

See also
Royal Gurkha Rifles
No. 7 Flight AAC
No. 667 Squadron AAC

References

External links
The British Army in Brunei — British Army official website
Armed Forces website

Training establishments of the British Army
British Army deployments
Brunei–United Kingdom relations
Military of Brunei
Jungle warfare training facilities